Baeotherates is an extinct genus of Early Permian captorhinid reptile known from Oklahoma, United States.

Discovery
Baeotherates is known from the holotype OMNH 55758, a dentary bone from the right mandible. It was collected within the Dolese Brothers Limestone Quarry of Richard's Spur in Comanche County, Oklahoma and found in the Garber Formation of the Sumner Group, which dates to the middle Sakmarian stage of the Early Permian, about 289 ± 0.68 million years ago.

Etymology
Baeotherates was first named by W. J. May and Richard L. Cifelli in 1998 and the type species is Baeotherates fortsillensis. The generic name means "small hunter". The specific name named after the military base Fort Sill near the type locality.

References

Captorhinids
Fossil taxa described in 1998
Permian reptiles of North America
Prehistoric reptile genera